The Benin women's national handball team is the national team of Benin. It is governed by the Fédération Béninoise de Handball and takes part in international handball competitions.

African Championship record
1979 – 8th

External links
IHF profile

Women's national handball teams
Handball
National team